There have been numerous prominent statues of Winston Churchill. These include:

In the United Kingdom 
Statue of Winston Churchill, Palace of Westminster
Statue of Winston Churchill, Parliament Square
Statue of Winston Churchill, Woodford

In the United States 
Statue of Winston Churchill (Washington, D.C.)

In France 
Statue of Winston Churchill, Paris

See also 
Bust of Winston Churchill, Mishkenot Sha'ananim, Jerusalem